Splendrillia angularia is a species of sea snail, a marine gastropod mollusk in the family Drilliidae.

Description

Distribution
This species occurs in the demersal zone of the Pacific Ocean off New Caledonia at a depth of 720 m.

References

 Wells, F. E. (1995). A revision of the drilliid genera Splendrillia and Plagiostropha (Gastropoda: Conoidea) from New Caledonia, with additional records from other areas. in: Bouchet, P. (Ed.) Résultats des Campagnes MUSORSTOM 14. Mémoires du Muséum national d'Histoire naturelle. Série A, Zoologie. 167: 527-556.

External links
 Holotype at MNHN, Paris
  Tucker, J.K. 2004 Catalog of recent and fossil turrids (Mollusca: Gastropoda). Zootaxa 682:1–1295.

angularia
Gastropods described in 1995